Monastir may refer to:

Places

Tunisia
 Monastir, Tunisia, the capital of Monastir Governorate
 Monastir Habib Bourguiba International Airport
 Monastir Governorate, one of the twenty-four governorates of Tunisia

Other places
 Monastir, Republic of Macedonia, the former name of Bitola
 Manastir Vilayet, covering parts of modern Albania, Greece and the Republic of North Macedonia
 Monastir, Sardinia, a comune in the Province of Cagliari, Italy

Other uses
 US Monastir, a football club from Monastir, Tunisia

See also
 Manastir (disambiguation)